The 2004 Wales Rally GB (formally the 60th Wales Rally of Great Britain) was a rallying autosports race held over four days between 16 and 19 September 2004 and operated out of Cardiff, Wales, United Kingdom. It was the twelfth round of the 2004 World Rally Championship (WRC) and the 60th running of the event. Contested over 19 stages, the rally was won by Subaru World Rally Team driver Petter Solberg. Sébastien Loeb finished second for the Citroën World Rally Team and Ford driver Markko Märtin came in third.

Report

Background 
The 2004 Wales Rally GB was the twelfth round of the 2004 World Rally Championship (WRC) after taking a two-week break since the previous race of the season in Japan. It was held over four days from Thursday, 16 September to Sunday, 19 September 2004. The rally headquarters was set up in Cardiff but some stages of the rally were altered. One new place the rally went to was Epynt forest with parts of the Rhondda and Resolven combined to form a new stage. The stage in Rheola returned to the event but was revised to make it faster and the rally concluded in Cardiff instead of Margam Country Park the previous year. Before the event, Sébastien Loeb led the Drivers' Championship with 84 points, ahead of Petter Solberg in second and Markko Märtin third. Carlos Sainz was fourth on 50 points, and Marcus Grönholm was three points adrift in fifth. Citroën were leading the Manufacturers' Championship with 137 points; Ford stood in second on 102 points, 33 in front of Subaru. Peugeot were fourth on 73 points and Mitsubishi rounded out the top five with 17 points. Citroën had so far been the most successful team over the course of the season with Ford claiming one victory with Märtin in México and Subaru had taken three wins apiece.

With pressure from the South Wales Police who initiated a campaign against speeding, the rally was under threat from cancellation as several drivers had been observed exceeding the local speed limit in the 2002 event, and the world governing body of motorsport, the Fédération Internationale de l'Automobile (FIA), announced it would investigate whether the roads were suitable for the large amount of rally traffic. On 12 December 2003 the Wales Rally GB was granted a provisional slot on the 2004 WRC calendar pending a formal road review by the Motor Sports Association (MSA) after the FIA chose not to downgrade the event which would have made the event illegible to count for championship points. Five towns in England were mooted as alternative bases in the event Wales was deemed unsuitable. The FIA president Max Mosley later held discussions with the chief constable of South Wales Police Barbara Wilding and the Secretary of State for Wales Peter Hain. At the FIA World Motor Sport Council meeting in Paris on 24 March, the MSA presented a traffic management report that confirmed the roads the rally used were safer than the national average. The council later confirmed that the rally would be given the go-ahead but would be monitored by FIA observers until its future as a championship round was secure.

87 crews registered to compete in the rally. The starting order for Leg 1 was "Priority 1" (P1) and P2 WRC drivers in the order of the current classification following the previous race of the 2004 season, followed by all other drivers as decided by the MSA. Solberg, the previous season's champion, set off first, followed by Loeb, then Sainz.

Entry list

Itinerary
All dates and times are BST (UTC+1).

Results

Overall

World Rally Cars

Classification

Special stages

Championship standings

Junior World Rally Championship

Classification

Special stages

Championship standings

References

External links 
 Official website of the World Rally Championship
 2004 Wales Rally GB at Rallye-info 

Wales Rally GB
2004 Wales Rally GB
Wales Rally GB
September 2004 sports events in the United Kingdom